Dupucharopa millestriata is a species of small, air-breathing land snails, terrestrial gastropod mollusks in the family Charopidae. This species is endemic to Australia.

Distribution
This species is endemic to the coastal areas of Western Australia.

References

 Smith, E.A. 1874. Mollusca. pp. 1–7 in Richardson, J. & Gray, J.E. (eds). The Zoology of H.M.S. Erebus and Terror under the command of Captain Sir James Clark Ross. R.N., F.R.S. during the years 1839 to 1843. London : E.W. Johnson Vol. 2 (21).
 Solem, A. 1984. Small land snails from Northern Australia. III. Species of Helicodiscidae and Charopidae. Journal of the Malacological Society of Australia 6(3–4): 155-179

Gastropods of Australia
Dupucharopa
Vulnerable fauna of Australia
Gastropods described in 1874
Taxonomy articles created by Polbot